Long-snouted treefrog may refer to:

 Kurixalus naso, a frog in the family Rhacophoridae found in northeastern India, Tibet, and Myanmar
 Taruga longinasus a frog in the family Rhacophoridae endemic to Sri Lanka

Animal common name disambiguation pages